Tyler Larter (born March 12, 1968) is a Canadian former professional ice hockey centre. He played in one National Hockey League (NHL) game for the Washington Capitals, playing against the New York Islanders. He failed to register a point and went -1 in the game, taking two shots on goal.

Larter was born in Charlottetown, Prince Edward Island.

See also
List of players who played only one game in the NHL

External links

1968 births
Baltimore Skipjacks players
Canadian ice hockey centres
Sportspeople from Charlottetown
Kalamazoo Wings (1974–2000) players
Living people
Moncton Hawks players
Sault Ste. Marie Greyhounds players
Washington Capitals draft picks
Washington Capitals players
Ice hockey people from Prince Edward Island